Tonia Couch (born 20 May 1989) is a former British Olympic diver.

Biography
Tonia Couch was born in Plymouth. She had been a fairly accomplished competitive gymnast when she participated in diving for a "trial" in September 1999.  Just four weeks later, she won her first competition, a novice event at Crystal Palace in London. In February 2002, she became the youngest girl ever to qualify for the lottery funded Junior Olympic Programme, when she took bronze in the Junior girls platform event at the British Championships. It was at that point that her talent on the platform was really recognised.

She participated at the 2005 and 2007 World Championships, finishing 25th in the 10 m platform in both.

In 2008 and 2009, her eighth-place finishes at the Olympics and the World Championships, the best result by a British female for 20 years, secured her place in British diving history.

She competed at the 2009 World Championships in Rome and at her second Commonwealth Games in 2010 in Delhi.  At the 2010 Commonwealth games her 10m synchro partnership with Sarah Barrow gained fourth place.

Couch reached the World final again in 2011, finishing ninth in the 10m platform. In synchro partnership with Sarah Barrow, the pair finished fourth.

The duo won the European gold and World Cup bronze in 2012, and a finished in fifth-place in front of a home crowd at the London 2012 Olympics.

In the 2013 season, she reclaimed the British 10m platform title, and competed at her fifth consecutive World Championships in the summer, finishing ninth in the 10m platform and fifth with Barrow in the 10m synchro."

In the 2014 season she finished fourth at the World Cup in Shanghai, then combined with Barrow to win a silver medal at the Commonwealth games held in Glasgow, 2014.

At the March 2015 World Series in Dubai, Couch took third place in the 10m platform event. She won the overall title of Diving World Series champion for the 10m platform, after winning four bronze medals in the series. She and Sarah Barrow also won two bronzes and a silver in the synchro event. She participated in the World Championships in Kazan, reaching 8th in the 10 m platform event and 6th in the 10 m synchro event with Sarah Barrow. This helped Team GB to secure a quota place at the 2016 Olympics.

In 2016, Couch appeared on Deal or no Deal on Tour as a box-opener.

Couch participated in 10m platform diving in Diving World Series 2016 in Kazan in April 2016 and won a silver medal with a score of 365.90, less than two points behind the gold winner Qian Ren. Her best dive was an inward 3 1/2 somersaults in pike position (DD 3.2) which got a score of 81.60.

In the Rio Olympics, Couch and Lois Toulson won fifth place in synchronized 10m platform with a score of 319.44. Couch also competed in 10m platform and reached the finals, finishing in 12th place with a score of 323.70.

She participated in Diving World Series 2017 Beijing between 3–5 March 2017 competing in the Women's synchronised 10m, teamed with Toulson and finishing in fifth place with a score of 294.72. Couch participated in the Diving World Series 2017 between 9 - 11 Mar 2017 in Guangzhou, again teamed with Lois Toulson and finishing in 5th place with a score of 308.16 in the 10m synchronized platform diving. On 31 March 2017 Couch and Toulson competed in the Diving World Series 2017 in Kazan, again finishing in fifth place in the 10m platform synchronized diving with a score of 269.58.

She qualified for the World Championships in 2016, competing in the synchronised 10 m platform event with Toulson.

Following her retirement, Couch received a special recognition award at the British Diving Championships on 26 January 2018.

Diving achievements

References

External links
London 2012 athlete profile
Swimming.org
BBC article

English female divers
Divers at the 2008 Summer Olympics
Divers at the 2012 Summer Olympics
Divers at the 2016 Summer Olympics
Olympic divers of Great Britain
Sportspeople from Plymouth, Devon
1989 births
Living people
Divers at the 2014 Commonwealth Games
Commonwealth Games silver medallists for England
Commonwealth Games medallists in diving
Medallists at the 2014 Commonwealth Games